Phono-semantic matching (PSM) is the incorporation of a word into one language from another, often creating a neologism, where the word's non-native quality is hidden by replacing it with phonetically and semantically similar words or roots from the adopting language. Thus the approximate sound and meaning of the original expression in the source language are preserved, though the new expression (the PSM – the phono-semantic match) in the target language may sound native.

Phono-semantic matching is distinct from calquing, which includes (semantic) translation but does not include phonetic matching (i.e., retention of the approximate sound of the borrowed word through matching it with a similar-sounding pre-existent word or morpheme in the target language). 

Phono-semantic matching is also distinct from homophonic translation, which retains the sound of a word but not the meaning.

History
The term "phono-semantic matching" was introduced by linguist and revivalist Ghil'ad Zuckermann. It challenged Einar Haugen's classic typology of lexical borrowing (loanwords). While Haugen categorized borrowing into either substitution or importation, camouflaged borrowing in the form of PSM is a case of "simultaneous substitution and importation." Zuckermann proposed a new classification of multisourced neologisms, words deriving from two or more sources at the same time. Examples of such mechanisms are phonetic matching, semanticized phonetic matching and phono-semantic matching.

Zuckermann concludes that language planners, for example members of the Academy of the Hebrew Language, employ the very same techniques used in folk etymology by laymen, as well as by religious leaders. He urges lexicographers and etymologists to recognize the widespread phenomena of camouflaged borrowing and multisourced neologization and not to force one source on multi-parental lexical items.

Examples

Arabic
Zuckermann analyses the evolution of the word artichoke. Beginning in Arabic  "the artichoke", it was adapted into Andalusian Arabic alxarshofa, then Old Spanish alcarchofa, then Italian alcarcioffo, then Northern Italian arcicioffo > arciciocco > articiocco, then phonetically realised in English as artichoke.

Arabic has made use of phono-semantic matching to replace blatantly imported new terminology with a word derived from an existing triliteral root. Examples are:

Dutch
A number of PSMs exist in Dutch as well. Natively, the word is transparently analysed as a "hang-mat", which aptly describes the object. Similarly:
 In  ("anchovy"), the second part was modified to resemble  ("fish"), although the word originates in Spanish anchova;
 Dutch dictionary Van Dale describes  as a particularly notable example.

English
A few PSMs exist in English. The French word  ("Carthusian monastery") was translated to the English charterhouse. The French name for the Osage orange,  ( "bow-wood"), is sometimes rendered as "bowdark". In Canada, the cloudberry is called "bakeapple" after the French phrase baie qu'appelle 'the what-do-you-call-it berry'.

The second part of the word muskrat was altered to match rat, replacing the original form , which derives from an Algonquian (possibly Powhatan) word, muscascus (literally "it is red"), or from the Abenaki native word mòskwas.

The use of runagates in Psalm 68 of the Anglican Book of Common Prayer derives from phono-semantic matching between Latin  and English  .

Finnish
The Finnish compound word for "jealous"  literally means "black-socked" ( "black" and  "sock"). However, the word is a case of a misunderstood loan translation from Swedish  "black-sick". The Finnish word  fit with a close phonological equivalent to the Swedish . Similar cases are  "hardworking person", literally "work mole", from  "work ant", matching  "ant" to  "mole", and  "clavus", literally "extra toe", from  <  "dead thorn", matching  "extra" to  "dead (archaic)" and  "toe" to  <  "thorn".

German

Icelandic
 demonstrate how Icelandic camouflages many English words by means of phono-semantic matching. For example, the Icelandic-looking word eyðni, meaning "AIDS", is a PSM of the English acronym AIDS, using the pre-existent Icelandic verb eyða, meaning "to destroy", and the Icelandic nominal suffix -ni. Similarly, the Icelandic word tækni, meaning "technology, technique", derives from tæki, meaning "tool", combined with the nominal suffix -ni, but is, in fact, a PSM of the Danish (or international) teknik, meaning "technology, technique". Tækni was coined in 1912 by Dr Björn Bjarnarson from Viðfjörður in the East of Iceland. It had been in little use until the 1940s, but has since become common, as a lexeme and as an element in new formations, such as raftækni, lit. "electrical technics", i.e. "electronics", tæknilegur "technical" and tæknir "technician". Other PSMs discussed in the article are beygla, bifra bifrari, brokkál, dapur dapurleiki - depurð, fjárfesta - fjárfesting, heila, guðspjall, ímynd, júgurð, korréttur, Létt og laggott, musl, pallborð pallborðsumræður, páfagaukur, ratsjá, setur, staða, staðall staðla stöðlun, toga togari, uppi and veira.

Japanese

In modern Japanese, loanwords are generally represented phonetically via katakana. However, in earlier times loanwords were often represented by kanji (Chinese characters), a process called  when used for phonetic matching, or  when used for semantic matching. Some of these continue to be used; the characters chosen may correspond to the sound, the meaning, or both.

In most cases the characters used were chosen only for their matching sound or only for their matching meaning.

In some cases, however, the kanji were chosen for both their semantic and phonetic values, a form of phono-semantic matching. The characters can mean "wings coming together", as the pointed  resembles a bird with wings folded together.

Mandarin Chinese
PSM is frequently used in Mandarin borrowings.

An example is the Taiwanese Mandarin word  , which literally means "powerful and hard" and refers to Viagra, the drug for treating impotence in men, manufactured by Pfizer.

Modern Standard Chinese /  "sonar" uses the characters /  "sound" and /  "receive, accept". 'deliver, carry, give (as a present)',   'pine; loose, slack', /  'tower; alarm, attract' etc.),  (cf. 'receive, accept',   'receive, accept',   'hand',   'head', /  'beast',   'thin' and so forth).

According to Zuckermann, PSM in Mandarin is common in:

 brand names, e.g. / , "Coca-Cola" translates to "tasty [and] entertaining", / itself genericised to refer to any cola.
 computer jargon, e.g. the aforementioned word for "World Wide Web"
 technological terms, e.g. the aforementioned word for "sonar".
 toponyms, e.g. the name / , "Belarus" combines the word  , "White" with the name / , "Russia", therefore meaning "White Russia" just like the endonym "".

From a monolingual Chinese view, Mandarin PSM is the 'lesser evil' compared with Latin script (in digraphic writing) or code-switching (in speech). Zuckermann's exploration of PSM in Standard Chinese and Meiji-period Japanese concludes that the Chinese writing system is multifunctional: pleremic ("full" of meaning, e.g. logographic), cenemic ("empty" of meaning, e.g. phonographic - like a syllabary) and simultaneously cenemic and pleremic (phono-logographic). Zuckermann argues that Leonard Bloomfield's assertion that "a language is the same no matter what system of writing may be used" is inaccurate. "If Chinese had been written using roman letters, thousands of Chinese words would not have been coined, or would have been coined with completely different forms". Evidence of this can be seen in the Dungan language, a Chinese language that is closely related to Mandarin, but written phonetically in Cyrillic, where words are borrowed, often from Russian, directly without PSM.

A related practice is the translation of Western names into Chinese characters.

Modern Hebrew
Often in phono-semantic matching, the source-language determines both the root word and the noun-pattern. This makes it difficult to determine the source language's influence on the target-language morphology. For example, "the phono-semantic matcher of English dock with Israeli Hebrew  mivdók could have used after deliberately choosing the phonetically and semantically suitable root   meaning 'check' (Rabbinic) or 'repair' (Biblical) the noun-patterns mi⌂⌂a⌂á, ma⌂⌂e⌂á, mi⌂⌂é⌂et, mi⌂⌂a⌂áim etc. (each ⌂ represents a slot where a radical is inserted). Instead, mi⌂⌂ó⌂, which was not highly productive, was chosen because its [o] makes the final syllable of  mivdók sound like English dock."

Miscellaneous
The first part corresponds to the Ancient Greek prefix  (hiero-), meaning "sacred, holy".

Old High German widarlōn ("repayment of a loan") was rendered as widerdonum ("reward") in Medieval Latin. The last part corresponds to the Latin donum ("gift").

Viagra, a brand name which was suggested by Interbrand Wood (the consultancy firm hired by Pfizer), is itself a multisourced neologism, based on Sanskrit   ("tiger") but enhanced by the words vigour (i.e. strength) and Niagara (i.e. free/forceful flow).

Other than through Sinoxenic borrowings, Vietnamese employs phono-semantic matching less commonly than Chinese.

Motivations
According to Zuckermann, PSM has various advantages from the point of view of a puristic language planner:

 recycling obsolete lexical items
 camouflaging foreign influence (for the native speaker in the future)
 facilitating initial learning (mnemonics) (for the contemporary learner/speaker)

Other motivations for PSM include the following:

 playfulness (cf. midrashic tradition of homiletic commentary, cf. the Jewish pilpul)
 Apollonianism (the wish to create order/meaningfulness, cf. folk etymology, etymythology, paronymic attraction)
 iconicity (the belief that there is something intrinsic about the sound of names; cf. phonaesthetics)
 political correctness / rejective lexical engineering
 attracting customers (in the case of brand names)

Expressive loan
An expressive loan is a loanword incorporated into the expressive system of the borrowing language, making it resemble native words or onomatopoeia.  Expressive loanwords are hard to identify, and by definition, they follow the common phonetic sound change patterns poorly.  Likewise, there is a continuum between "pure" loanwords and "expressive" loanwords. The difference to a folk etymology (or an eggcorn) is that a folk etymology is based on misunderstanding, whereas an expressive loan is changed on purpose, the speaker taking the loanword knowing full well that the descriptive quality is different from the original sound and meaning.

South-eastern Finnish, for example, has many expressive loans. The main source language, Russian, does not use the vowels 'y', 'ä' or 'ö' [y æ ø]. Thus, it is common to add these to redescriptivized loans to remove the degree of foreignness that the loanword would otherwise have. For example, tytinä "brawn" means "wobblyness", and superficially it looks like a native construction, originating from the verb tutista "to wobble" added with a front vowel sound in the vowel harmony. However, it is expressivized from tyyteni (which is a confusing word as -ni is a possessive suffix), which in turn is a loanword from Russian stúden'. A somewhat more obvious example is tökötti "sticky, tarry goo", which could be mistaken as a derivation from the onomatopoetic word tök (cf. the verb tökkiä "to poke"). However, it is an expressive loan of Russian d'ogot' "tar".

See also

 Bilingual pun
 Calque
 Eggcorn
 Hybrid word
 Hobson-Jobson
 Internationalism
 Language contact
 Lexicology
 Neologism
 Phonestheme
 Poetry
 Portmanteau
 Translation
 Word formation

References

Citations

External links
Jane C. Hu, 23 October 2016: LOST IN TRANSLATION: The genius and stupidity of corporate America are on display when companies rebrand for new countries

Word coinage
Linguistic morphology
Linguistic typology
Grammar
Sociolinguistics
Language contact
Linguistic purism
Pidgins and creoles
Chinese language
Semantics
Hebrew language

he:גלעד צוקרמן#"תשמו"ץ"